K Movies Pinoy was a Filipino cable channel owned by Viva Entertainment. It broadcast Filipino-dubbed Korean films 24/7. Most of the films broadcast were action films, but the channel also showcased other genres including romance, thriller, horror and drama as well.

After 21 months of broadcasting, K Movies Pinoy has permanently ceased its operations by Viva Entertainment due to discontinuation of its telecast by content provider. Meanwhile, all Filipino-dubbed Korean movies continues to air on its sister channel, Tagalized Movie Channel.

References

Viva Entertainment
Television networks in the Philippines
Defunct television networks in the Philippines
Movie channels in the Philippines
Filipino-language television stations
Television channels and stations established in 2019
Television channels and stations disestablished in 2021
2019 establishments in the Philippines
2021 disestablishments in the Philippines